Tijn Daverveld (born 29 April 2000) is a Dutch professional footballer.

Club career
He made his Eerste Divisie debut for Jong PSV on 13 January 2019 in a game against Jong Ajax, as a starter.

References

External links
 

2000 births
People from Boxmeer
Living people
Dutch footballers
Netherlands youth international footballers
Association football defenders
Jong PSV players
AEL Limassol players
Eerste Divisie players
Cypriot First Division players
Expatriate footballers in Cyprus
Dutch expatriate sportspeople in Cyprus
Footballers from North Brabant
21st-century Dutch people